Kožino is a village located 9 km northwest of Zadar, in northern Dalmatia, Croatia, with population of 815 (2011 census).

The church of St. Michael the Archangel was built in 1522.

References

External links

Populated places in Zadar County